Gongora unicolor is a species of plant in the family Orchidaceae.

References

unicolor
Orchids of Belize
Orchids of Mexico
Flora of Veracruz
Orchids of Central America